The Bangladesh national rugby union sevens team currently competes in the Asian Sevens Series. It is managed by Bangladesh Rugby Federation Union

In 2018 Bangladesh won bowl group of 2018 Asia Rugby Sevens Series

See also
 Rugby union in Bangladesh

References

National sports teams of Bangladesh
National rugby sevens teams
Rugby union in Bangladesh